The Mass Central Rail Trail is a partially-completed rail trail from Northampton, Massachusetts to Boston along the former right of way of the Massachusetts Central Railroad. When complete, it will run  through Central Massachusetts and Greater Boston. Many segments of the trail, including the Norwottuck Branch Rail Trail and the Somerville Community Path, have been developed as separate projects but will serve as part of the complete Mass Central Rail Trail.

Trail sections

Northampton to Amherst
The trail is fully complete and paved through Northampton. The  section west of downtown is managed by the City of Northampton. (It was formerly the New Haven and Northampton Company Williamstown Branch, not part of the Central Massachusetts Railroad, and is not included in the 104-mile tally.) The Norwottuck Branch Rail Trail runs from downtown Northampton through Hadley and Amherst into Belchertown; it is managed by the Massachusetts Department of Conservation and Recreation (DCR).

Belchertown to Ware
The trail is open and paved from the Amherst town line to Warren Wright Road, managed by the Mass DCR. From Warrern Wright Road to Federal Street, the rail line is privately owned and has been largely obliterated by development. This section is no longer intact as a right-of-way. From Federal Street to Route 181, the trail right-of-way is owned by the Town of Belchertown and is open primarily as a snowmobile trail. It is unpaved, with some rough sections but is mostly followable on foot or mountain bike. The sections north of the US 202 overpass are more overgrown, with the southern sections clearer and better maintained. From Route 181 to the Ware River/Palmer line, the rail right-of-way is privately owned and not accessible to the public. The bridge over the Ware River was demolished after rail abandonment and there is no river crossing available.

The rail right-of-way in Palmer is unused and overgrown, but still owned by the railroad.  Old rails and ties are still in place and no trail development has taken place. 

South of the Ware River in Ware, the rail right-of-way is still in use by a freight railroad. The bridge over the Ware River is missing, making the section of right-of-way between the river and the Wal-Mart Plaza unusable. From the Wal-Mart Plaza to Robbins Road, the trail is open. It is clear and has a hard-packed gravel surface and is usable by walkers and bikes. This section is owned and maintained by the Town of Ware. Past Robbins Road to the upper Ware River crossing, two river bridges are missing and the rail yard on the east side of the river is still active, blocking the trail right-of-way. South from Upper Church Street, a section of trail is open and complete, maintained by the East Quabbin Land Trust.  This has a hard packed gravel surface. North of Upper Church Street to the Hardwick town line, the rail right-of-way is undeveloped and not open to the public.  This stretch is owned by the Massachusetts Electric Co, and groups are working to make an arrangement that would allow this section to be developed as a trail sometime in the future. In 2019, the state awarded $95,000 for the first phase of construction.

Hardwick to Barre
The section from the Ware town line through the village of Gilbertville to Route 32 east of the village is owned by the town (except for one short privately owned section at the town line itself). A short bit along the river is part of a hiking trail loop, but is very overgrown and only kept clear enough for walkers.  This section is not currently developed or open as a through trail. In 2022, the town was awarded $133,000 in state funds to improve the section at Ware River Park to MCRT standards.

The right-of-way paralleling Route 32 from Gilbertville to Creamery Road is no longer intact and has been lost to development and private ownership. In addition, the bridge over the active rail line is missing. This stretch is not open to public use. From Creamery Road to Maple Steeet, the trail is complete and open to the public.  This stretch has a hard packed gravel surface and is open to all non-motorized use.  It is owned and maintained by the East Quabbin Land Trust. From Maple Street to the Barre town line, the trail right of way is obstructed by a missing bridge and the Tanner-Hiller Airport and is not open to the public. 

From the New Braintree town line to Barre Depot Road, the right of way in Barre is either obstructed by private development (south of Route 67) or part of an active section of railroad (north of Route 67). East of Barre Depot Road, the right-of-way is obliterated by development. A connector trail has been constructed to connect Route 122 to the beginning of the intact rail right-of-way and trail near the Oakham town line.

Oakham to West Boylston
The trail in Oakham, and as far as Glenwood Road in Rutland, is complete and open, as is from Wachusett Street to the Holden line. The trail has a hard-packed stone dust surface; it is owned by Massachusetts DCR and maintained by Wachusett Greenways. A section between Glenwood Road and Wachusett Street is currently not open due to a privately owned section of the right of way that is not open to the public. 

From the Rutland town line to the watershed lands near the Providence and Worcester Railroad, the Central Mass right-of-way is privately owned and lost to development. An on-road route is being used to fill the gap. Through the watershed conservation lands between the P&W RR and Asnebumskit Brook crossing, the trail is open to hikers and mountain bikers with a dirt surface. This stretch is owned by Mass DCR and is part of a mountain bike trail loop accessible from Mill Street. In 2019, the state awarded $126,000 to construct a more permanent trail on this section.

From Quinapoxet Street to River Street the railroad right-of-way is privately owned and lost to development. A detour route using Mill Street and a trail along the Wachusett Aqueduct has been developed to bypass this section. From River Street to the West Boylston town line the trail is complete and open with a hard packed stone dust surface. This section is owned and managed by Massachusetts DCR.

From the Holden town line to Thomas Street in West Boylston is complete and open with a hard packed stone dust surface. This section is owned and managed by Massachusetts DCR. Thru trail users must follow an on-road route from Thomas Street to the Clinton town line, as the rail line in this area is still active.

Clinton to Berlin
From the West Boylston town line to Gate 39 on Route 110, thru trail users must follow an on-road route. From Gate 39 to the west side of the Wachusett Reservoir Dam spillway is open to public use, but is a dead-end as the dam crossing is not open to the public. 

East of Route 70 to the Berlin town line the rail line is still undeveloped. A local land trust is in the process of acquiring the right-of-way from Pan Am Railway, including the railroad tunnel under Wilson Hill. In July 2020, the state awarded $112,000 for purchase and immediate opening of this segment. A further $397,000 state grant in 2022 will complete planning for the tunnel, and begin planning for the remainder of the trail east to the Berlin town line.

West of the Route 62/West Street intersection the rail right-of-way is undeveloped. It is partially owned by the town of Berlin and partially still owned by Pan Am Railways.

Berlin to Waltham

In 2011, The Massachusetts Department of Conservation and Recreation (DCR) executed a lease with the Massachusetts Bay Transportation Authority (MBTA) for 23 miles of the former railroad corridor from Waltham to Berlin, known as the Mass Central Rail Trail, Wayside.

East of the Route 62/West Street intersection, until the Assabet River Rail Trail in Hudson, the right-of-way remains undeveloped and overgrown with some missing bridges, but plans are being developed for future trail construction. 

The trail from the Assabet River Rail Trail in Hudson to the Sudbury/Wayland border is under Phase 1 construction, the Sudbury to Hudson Transmission Reliability Project. After Phase 1, DCR will pave the trail, install safe road crossings and complete final restoration of the trail under Phase 2. It will also connect to the Bruce Freeman Rail Trail in Sudbury.

The Sudbury/Wayland Rail-to-Trail project is under design and includes approximately two miles: Approximately one mile of trail between the Sudbury power substation and Wayland Town Center at Route 20 that has never been converted to trail, and approximately one mile of existing gravel trail from Route 20 to the Wayland Library on Route 27 that will be upgraded.

From the Wayland Town Library at Route 27 through Weston, the trail is paved and opened. It is managed by the Mass DCR (jointly with the town of Weston within its borders).

Design for the trail that will connect Weston to Waltham over Interstate 95 is in progress.

A short section of trail running from Hillside Road to Border Road has been completed and opened as a paved trail. It is jointly managed by Mass DCR and the City of Waltham.

In 2019, the state awarded $300,000 for design of the  section from Border Road to Beaver Street. State funding was awarded in 2022 for restoration of the Linden Street Bridge in Waltham, which was incorporated into this section. This section is currently under construction. 

East of Beaver Street, the trail will run parallel to the Fitchburg Line in space that was occupied by Central Massachusetts Railroad tracks until 1952, when the duplicate tracks from Beaver Brook to Hill Crossing were removed.

Belmont to Boston 

The Belmont Community Path is being designed and built in two phases. Phase 1 is the western portion  and state funding for the design was awarded in 2022. Phase 2 is the eastern portion and design is underway.

Through Cambridge and Somerville, the trail opened in segments between 1985 and 2015 as the Fitchburg Cutoff Path, Alewife Linear Park, and Somerville Community Path. An extension of the Somerville Community Path will open in 2023 as part of the Green Line Extension project. In East Cambridge, it will connect to existing paths running through the North Point development, North Point Park, and Paul Revere Park. The eastern terminus is at the Charles River Dam in Boston.

References

Further reading

External links

 masscentralrailtrain.org 

Rail trails in Massachusetts